This is a list of the rivers of Sweden.

Baltic Sea 

From south to north
Helgeå
Ljungbyån
Ronnebyån
Motala ström with Svartån

Bothnian Sea
Dalälven
Ljusnan
Ljungan
Indalsälven
Ångermanälven
Ume älv

Bothnian Bay
Skellefte älv
Pite älv
Lule älv
Kalix älv
Torne älv

Kattegat 
Lagan
Nissan
Ätran
Viskan
Göta älv - Klarälven (via Lake Vänern)

A-Z
A-Z of Swedish rivers. The lengths in miles are also given:

See also
Baltic Sea
Kattegat
Islands of Sweden
Geography of Sweden

References 

Sweden
Rivers